Radulf (died 920) was a Count of Besalú. He  was the younger son of Sunifred I, Count of Barcelona, and thus a brother of Wilfred the Hairy and Miró the Elder.

In 878, Wilfred separated the pagus of Besalú from the County of Girona and granted it to him as a county on the condition that it would continue in the descendants of Wilfred. On Radulf's death, Besalú passed to Miró II of Cerdanya the Younger, Wilfred's son.

Counts of Besalú
920 deaths
Year of birth unknown
10th-century Catalan people
10th-century Visigothic people